Rymill may refer to:

Organisations
H & F Rymill, land agents and financiers established in Adelaide, South Australia, in 1863

People 

Arthur Campbell Rymill (1907–1989), businessman, solicitor and Lord Mayor of Adelaide
Arthur Graham Rymill (1886–1966), Adelaide businessman
Frank Rymill (1837–1915), founding partner of H & F Rymill
Henry Rymill (1836–1927), founder of H & F Rymill
Henry Way Rymill (1907–1971), Chief Commissioner of Scouts in South Australia from 1936 
John Rymill (1905-1968), Australian polar explorer
Kenneth Rymill (1906–1977), English cricketer
Mary Anne Rymill (1817–1897), New Zealand missionary, teacher, nurse and companion
Shylie Katherine Rymill (1882–1959), State Commissioner of Girl Guides in South Australia from 1938 to 1950

Places 

Cape Rymill, Antarctica
Mount Rymill, Antarctica
Rymill Bay, Antarctica
Rymill Coast, Antarctic Peninsula
Rymill House, an historic building in Hutt Street, Adelaide
Rymill Park, in Adelaide's East Parklands